Dowlais High Street railway station was a station that served the village of Dowlais, Merthyr Tydfil, Wales on the Merthyr, Tredegar and Abergavenny Railway. The station closed in 1962 The site is now occupied by Station Terrace with only the steps visible.  .

References 

Disused railway stations in Merthyr Tydfil County Borough
Former London and North Western Railway stations
Railway stations in Great Britain opened in 1885
Railway stations in Great Britain closed in 1958
1885 establishments in Wales
1962 disestablishments in Wales